This list is of paintings designated in the category of  for the Prefecture of Kōchi, Japan.

National Cultural Properties
As of 1 July 2019, two Important Cultural Properties have been designated, being of national significance.

Prefectural Cultural Properties
As of 1 May 2019, six properties have been designated at a prefectural level.

See also
 Cultural Properties of Japan
 List of National Treasures of Japan (paintings)
 Japanese painting
 List of Historic Sites of Japan (Kōchi)
 List of Cultural Properties of Japan - historical materials (Kōchi)

References

External links
  Cultural Properties in Kōchi Prefecture

Cultural Properties,Kōchi
Cultural Properties,Paintings
Paintings,Kōchi
Lists of paintings